Catalan Left Union (UEC) was an electoral coalition in Catalonia, Spain, formed by the Unified Socialist Party of Catalonia (PSUC) and Agreement of Left Nationalists (ENE) in 1986.

History
UEC contested the 1986 election, and received 123,912 votes (0.6% of the votes in Spain, 3.9% of the votes in Catalonia) and one seat in the Spanish parliament. The following year, PSUC formed a new alliance, Initiative for Catalonia. The elected MP was Ramon Espasa i Oliver from Barcelona.

References

Defunct political party alliances in Spain